Basic Training in the United States Army is the initial training for new military personnel typified by intense physical activity, psychological stress and the development of social cohesion. The United States Army Center for Initial Military Training (USACIMT) was created in 2009 under the U.S. Army Training and Doctrine Command to oversee training related issues.

United States Army Center for Initial Military Training 
The United States Army Center for Initial Military Training (USACIMT) was created by an act of Congress on September 24, 2009 under the U.S. Army Training and Doctrine Command (TRADOC) located at Fort Eustis in Newport News, Virginia. USACIMT was created as a separate, stand-alone organization to maintain senior-level oversight of training related issues.

USACIMT is the Core Function Lead for TRADOC for all initial entry training.  This provides a process that aligns the development of competencies (knowledge, skills, abilities, and attributes) and behaviors in civilian volunteers in order for them to become Soldiers who are physically ready, grounded in Army Values, and competent in their skills so they are able to contribute as leaders or members upon arrival at their first unit of assignment.  Initial Military Training includes the developing baseline proficiency on warrior tasks, battle drills, and critical skills associated with their Military Occupational Specialty (MOS) or officer basic branch.  USACIMT is the official command component responsible Army's Initial Entry Training (IET), which is commonly referred to as "Basic Training" or BCT for enlisted soldiers (the term "Boot Camp" pertains to the United States Marine Corps). USACIMT develops policies to improve and standardize training for Basic Combat Training (BCT), Advanced Individual Training (AIT), One Station Unit Training (OSUT) and the second phase of the Basic Officer Leadership Course (BOLC). Besides physical fitness and basic soldiering skills, the larger goal is to transform a recruit or draftee from a civilian to a military mindset.

USACIMT is the proponent for the Army Combat Fitness Test (ACFT), which is the Army's physical fitness test of record. The Leader Training Brigade (LTB), which conducts CIMT cadre leader development and provides training development oversight in support of the Soldier transformation process.  It provides leader training across the Army in resilience and fitness skills and supports the overall health and welfare of the force.  It also provides oversight for the Expert Soldier Badge Test Management Office (ESB TMO) and is responsible for administering the ESB standards published in TR 672-9 (Expert Soldier Badge). The ESB TMO validates Army brigades who train, test, and award the ESB to candidates who meet the standards. Additionally, the LTB has the following subordinate organizations: the Initial Military Training Leadership School, Task Force Marshall, U.S. Army Physical Fitness School, and the U.S. Army Master Resiliency School.

USACIMT Major Subordinate Organizations 
 Basic Combat Training Center of Excellence, Fort Jackson (South Carolina)
 108th Training Command (IET), Charlotte, North Carolina
 Leader Training Brigade, Fort Jackson, South Carolina

Commanders 
 LTG Mark P. Hertling:  24 September 2009 – 8 March 2011
 MG Richard Longo:  9 March 2011 – 2 March 2012
 MG Bradley May:  3 March 2012 – 20 November 2013
 MG Ross Ridge:  21 November 2013 – 2 July 2015
 MG Anthony Funkhouser:  3 July 2015 – 19 July 2017
 MG Malcolm B. Frost:  20 July 2017 - 26 April 2019
 MG Lonnie G. Hibbard:  27 April 2019 - 27 September 2021
 MG John D. Kline: 11 October 2021 – Present

External links 
 https://usacimt.tradoc.army.mil/
 https://usacimt.tradoc.army.mil/ltb
 https://usacimt.tradoc.army.mil/ltb/esb/esb.html
 https://usacimt.tradoc.army.mil/ltb/usasd/index.html

References 

Military education and training in the United States